The Parke County Covered Bridge Festival is a fall festival which takes place in nine communities in Parke County, Indiana, United States. It celebrates the county's 31 covered bridges, and is attended by more than 2 million people each year.  It begins on the second Friday in October and lasts 10 days.

Attractions include Fox's Overlook, Boardwalk and Parke Place, waterfall, historic mill, and the beautiful covered bridge.

The festival began in 1957, when a group of local women decided to hold a three-day festival to accommodate the many interested tourists looking for information about the bridges.  Now the festival is thriving and puts Mansfield on the map 10 days of the year. The first festival was rather small and occurred only in Rockville.

2020 saw no festival.

See also
 Parke County Covered Bridges

External links
 Official website

Covered bridges in Parke County, Indiana
Festivals in Indiana
Tourist attractions in Parke County, Indiana
Wooden bridges in Indiana